A Hindu temple is a pancharatha when there are five ratha (on plan) or paga (on elevation) on the tower of the temple (generally a shikhara). The rathas are vertical offset projection or facets. 
The name comes from the sanskrit Pancha (=five) and Ratha (=chariot), but the link with the concept of chariot is not clear.

There are also temples with three rathas (triratha), seven rathas (saptaratha) and nine rathas (navaratha).

Examples of pancharatha temples
 Lingaraja Temple in Bhubaneswar
 Lakshmana Temple in Khajuraho
 Rajarani Temple in Bhubaneswar
 Jagannath Temple in Puri, Odisha
 Jagannath Temple in Baripada, Odisha
 Jagannath Temple in Nayagarh, Odisha
 Isanesvara Siva Temple in Bhubaneswar
 Mukteswar Temple in Bhubaneswar
 Brahmani temple in Baleswar, Odisha

Notes

See also 
 Ratha (architecture)
Architectural elements
Hindu temple architecture